Piaparan, also known as pipaparan, piaran, or piarun, is a Filipino dish consisting of meat (usually chicken) or seafood cooked in a coconut milk-based broth with grated coconut, garlic, onions, ginger, turmeric,  young wild shallots (sakurab), labuyo chili, and various vegetables and spiced with palapa. It originates from the Maranao people of Lanao del Sur. Piaparan means "shredded coconut" in Maranao and is a type of ginataan.

See also
List of chicken dishes
Tinola
Tiyula itum

References

Philippine chicken dishes

Foods containing coconut